Agripino "Pino" Cawich (c. 1947 – 8 August 2003) was a Belizean politician who served as an Area Representative in the Belize House of Representatives from 1998 until his death in 2003. Cawich represented the Cayo South constituency as a member of the People's United Party.

Electoral history

A resident of the Belizean capital city of Belmopan, Cawich was an agricultural expert who worked extensively with the Belizean sugar industry. He was elected to the Belize House in 1998 and 2003 elections, both times defeating John Saldivar of the United Democratic Party. While in office he served as Minister of State.

Saldivar won the by-election held after Cawich's death, defeating Agripino's son Pablo Joaquin Cawich.

Death

Cawich died on 8 August 2003 at the UAMS Medical Center in Little Rock, Arkansas, where he was being treated for cancer. His remains were returned to Belize where Agripino was given a state funeral. Cawich is interred in the Belmopan Cemetery.

References

1947 births
Date of birth missing
2003 deaths
People from Corozal District
People's United Party politicians
Government ministers of Belize
Members of the Belize House of Representatives for Cayo South
University of Arizona alumni
University of Florida alumni
Deaths from cancer in Arkansas